Vlasopoulos is a Greek surname. Notable people with the surname include:

Nikolaos Vlasopoulos (born 1988), Greek footballer
Stylianos Vlasopoulos (1748–1822), Greek noble and senator

Greek-language surnames
Surnames of Greek origin